is a passenger railway station located in the city of Nishiwaki, Hyōgo Prefecture, Japan, operated by West Japan Railway Company (JR West).

Lines
Nihon-heso-kōen Station is served by the Kakogawa Line and is 36.1 kilometers from the terminus of the line at

Station layout
The station consists of one ground-level side platform serving bi-directional track. The station is unattended.

History
Nihon-heso-kōen Station opened on 4 May 1985. With the privatization of the Japan National Railways (JNR) on 1 April 1987, the station came under the aegis of the West Japan Railway Company.

Passenger statistics
In fiscal 2019, the station was used by an average of 8 passengers daily

Surrounding area
 Nishiwaki Latitude and Geoscience Museum
 Okanoyama Art Museum
 Sairin-ji temple

See also
List of railway stations in Japan

References

External links

  

Railway stations in Hyōgo Prefecture
Railway stations in Japan opened in 1985
Nishiwaki, Hyōgo